Sen may refer to:

Surname
 Sen (surname), a Bengali surname
 Şen, a Turkish surname
 A variant of the Serer patronym Sène

Currency subunit
 Etymologically related to the English word cent; a hundredth of the following currencies:
 Brunei dollar
 Cambodian riel
 Malaysian ringgit
 Indonesian rupiah
 Etymologically unrelated to the English word cent; a hundredth of the following currency:
 Japanese yen -

People
 Amartya Sen (born 1933), Indian economist and philosopher
 Aparna Sen (born 1945), an Indian filmmaker and actress
 Antara Dev Sen (born 1963), a British–Indian journalist
 Asit Sen (actor) (1917 – 1993), an Indian actor
 Kaushik Sen (or Koushik Sen), an Indian actor
 Ko Chung Sen (born 1968), a Malaysian politician
 Konkona Sen Sharma (born 1979), an Indian actress and director
 Lakshya Sen (born 2001), an Indian badminton player
 Lin Sen (1868 – 1943, a former chairman of the government of the 1912–49 Republic of China
 Mihir Sen (1930 – 1997), an Indian swimmer
 Moon Moon Sen (born 1954), an Indian actress
 Nandana Sen (born 1967), an Indian actress and writer
 Raima Sen (born 1979), an Indian actress
Ramprasad Sen, saint and poet
 Reema Sen (born 1981), an Indian actress
 Rimi Sen (born 1981), an Indian actress and film producer
 Riya Sen (born 1981), an Indian actress and model
 Sandipta Sen (born 1987), a Bengali television actress
 Shobha Sen (1923 - 2017, a Bengali theatre and film actress
 Srabani Sen or Sraboni Sen, an Indian singer
 Surya Sen (1894 – 1934), a revolutionary
 Suchitra Sen (born as Roma Dasgupta, 1931), an Indian actress
 Sushmita Sen (born 1975), an Indian actress and model
 Sen no Rikyū (born 1522)
 Senhime (1597–1666), or Princess Sen
 Sun Yat-sen, Chinese leader
 Ali Şen, Turkish actor
 Eren Şen, German-Turkish footballer
 Gülhan Şen, Turkish television presenter, producer, and speaker
H. Nida Sen, Turkish ophthalmologist
 Şener Şen, Turkish actor
 Volkan Şen, Turkish footballer

Places
 London Southend Airport, UK, IATA airport code
 Sen, Abadan, a village in Khuzestan Province, Iran
 Sen, Iran, a village in Khuzestan Province
 Sen, Zanjan, a village in Iran
 Sen Brahmana, a village in Jammu and Kashmir, India

Other uses
 Sen (go), a handicapping term in the game go
 Sen (Mandaeism), the Mandaean name for the moon
 Sen., an abbreviation for the title Senator
 Sen, a character in the film Spirited Away
 Sen (unit) in Thai measurement
 SEN, Special Educational Needs
 SEN, Sports Entertainment Network

See also